Štěpán Žilka (born 11 November 1988 in Litovel) is a Czech chess grandmaster

He earned his international master title in 2007 and his grandmaster title in 2014.

He started his career with TJ Tatran Litovel, since 2012 he played for 1. Novoborský ŠK but also played in Austria (Blackburne Nickelsdorf) and in Germany (SF Deizsiau). 2009 he won the Olomuc Chess Summer (C-Group) ahead of Konstantin Chernyshov. In 2008, 2010–2011, 2013–2014 and 2016–2017 he played with the Czech Team in the Mitropa Cup and won it in 2016.  

His peak rating was 2613 in April 2022.

External links

 olimpbase.org

1988 births
Living people
Chess grandmasters
Czech chess players
People from Litovel